Glinë is a settlement in the former Dropull i Poshtëm municipality, Gjirokastër County, southern Albania. At the 2015 local government reform it became part of the municipality Dropull. It is within the larger Dropull region. It is inhabited by members of the Greek minority in Albania.

References 

Populated places in Dropull
Greek communities in Albania
Villages in Gjirokastër County